Imeni O.S. Maselskoho is a station on Kharkiv Metro's Kholodnohirsko–Zavodska Line. It opened on 11 August 1978.

Until 2004, the station was called "Industrialna" ("Індустріальна"). In 2016, the metro station "Proletarska", also located on the Kholodnohirsko–Zavodska Line, was renamed to "Industrialna" to comply with laws banning Communist names in Ukraine.

References

Kharkiv Metro stations
Railway stations opened in 1978